Chili bowl or Chili Bowl may refer to:

Chili bowl, a bowl of (or especially intended to hold) chile con carne (commonly called simply "chili" in North American English)
Ben's Chili Bowl, a restaurant in Washington, D.C.
Chili bowl, another term for a bowl cut, a kind of hair style
Chili Bowl Nationals, an annual midget-car race that takes place in Tulsa, Oklahoma
Chili Bowl, a Los Angeles restaurant chain founded by Art Whizin
Chili Bowl (football), an annual football game in San Antonio, Texas
 Chili Bowl (Cincinnati), a proposed annual football game in Cincinnati, Ohio